(born October 8, 1941) is a Japanese actress.  Born in the city of Osaka, she graduated from Joshibi High School of Art and Design in Suginami, Tokyo. In 1960, she was hired by Toei and made her acting debut. She remained with Toei until 1967, then became free to appear in films, on television, and on the stage. Her performance in the film W no higeki (or "W's Tragedy", 1984) earned the Japan Academy Prize for Best Supporting Actress in 1986. From 1991 to 1994, she topped Japan's official list of taxpayers in the Actors and Celebrities category.

Yoshiko appears in both contemporary and jidaigeki roles. She won the award for best actress at the 30th and at the 35th Blue Ribbon Awards.

With husband Yasuo Takahashi she has two sons, both actors.

Selected filmography

Film
Ōshō (1962)
Bushidō zankoku monogatari (1963) with Kinnosuke Nakamura, film won the Golden Bear at the 13th Berlin International Film Festival
Same (1964) with Kinnosuke Nakamura
Kuruwa Sodachi (1964), her first lead role
Yojōhan monogatari: Shōfu shino (1966）
Zatoichi kenka-daiko (1968) with Shintaro Katsu
Tsuma to onna no aida (1976)
The Fall of Ako Castle (1978)
A Ilha dos Amores (1982)
The Go Masters (1983)
W's Tragedy (1984)
Haru no Kane (1985)
Tora-san's Salad-Day Memorial (1988)
Rikyu (1989) as the wife of Sen no Rikyū with Rentarō Mikuni
Tōki Rakujitsu (1992)
Umineko (2004)
Diancie and the Cocoon of Destruction (2014) as Xerneas (voice)
 The Actor (2016) as Natsuko Matsumura
 The Promised Neverland (2020)
 The Three Sisters of Tenmasou Inn (2022) as Reiko Zaizen

Television
Taikōki  (NHK Taiga drama, 1965) as Yodo-dono
Kunitori Monogatari (NHK Taiga drama, 1973) as Miyoshino
Kōgen e Irrashai (Tokyo Broadcasting System series, 1976)
Sekigahara (TBS New Year's Special, 1981) as Yodo-Dono
Nyokei Kazoku (Yomiuri, 1984)
Inochi (NHK Taiga drama, 1986) in the leading role
Hana no Ran (NHK Taiga drama, 1994) as Hino Tomiko, the leading role
Gekai Arimori Saeko (Nippon Television, two series, 1990 and 1992) in the leading role
Ryōri no Tetsujin (Iron Chef) (1999) as a judge in the show's final battle between Hiroyuki Sakai and Alain Passard
Hana Moyu (NHK Taiga drama, 2015) as Sei
The Return (2020)

Commercials
Ajinomoto
Matsushita Electric
Seino Transportation
Lion Corporation
Taisho Pharmaceutical

Honours
Kinuyo Tanaka Award (1987)
Order of the Rising Sun, 4th Class, Gold Rays with Rosette (2014)

References

External links
 
 

1941 births
Japanese actresses
People from Osaka
Living people
Taiga drama lead actors
Recipients of the Order of the Rising Sun, 4th class